Arnold Huber (born 11 September 1967 in Bruneck, South Tyrol) is an Italian luger who competed during the 1990s. He won five medals at the FIL World Luge Championships, including one gold (Men's singles: 1991), two silver (Mixed team: 1990, 1995), and two bronze (1991, 1993).

Huber also finished fourth in the men's singles event at the 1994 Winter Olympics in Lillehammer.

He is the brother of fellow lugers Norbert Huber and Wilfried Huber and bobsledder Günther Huber.

References

External links
 

Living people
Italian lugers
Italian male lugers
Lugers at the 1994 Winter Olympics
Olympic lugers of Italy
1967 births
Sportspeople from Bruneck
Bobsledders of Centro Sportivo Carabinieri
Lugers of Centro Sportivo Carabinieri
Germanophone Italian people